The 2018 U-23 Baseball World Cup, officially II U-23 Baseball World Cup, is the second edition of the U-23 Baseball World Cup tournament, third since the tournament's inception in 2014 as the 21U Baseball World Cup. The tournament was held at Edgar Rentería Baseball Stadium in Barranquilla and 18 de Junio Baseball Stadium in Montería, Colombia.

Originally the host to the tournament was awarded to Nicaragua and would be held in Managua, but due to 2018–2020 Nicaraguan protests, WBSC subsequently decided to move the tournament to Colombia.

Mexico defeated Japan with a score of 6:1 in the championship game to win the gold medal. Venezuela won the bronze medal by defeating Korea in the third-place game with a score of 4:10.

Teams

Africa

Asia

Europe

Americas

Oceania

Wild Card

First round

Group A

|}

Group B

|}

Consolation round

|}

Super round

|}

Finals

Third place game

|}

Championship

|}

Final standings

U-23 All-World Team

External links
Event Official Website at WBSC

References

U-23 Baseball World Cup
2018 in baseball
International baseball competitions hosted by Colombia
U-23 Baseball World Cup
Baseball World Cup
Baseball World Cup
21st century in Barranquilla
Montería